Ogenyi Eddy Onazi (born 25 December 1992) is a Nigerian professional footballer who plays as a central midfielder for Serie D side Casertana.

He has also played for the Nigeria national team, with whom he won the Africa Cup of Nations in 2013.

Club career

Early years in Nigeria
Onazi began playing football in the streets of Jos in 1998. His football skills and abilities drew a lot of attention to him and afforded him the opportunity to play in some academies in the city.

His footballing abilities came to prominence when he moved to the city of Lagos to play for My People.

Lazio
Onazi joined Lazio in 2011, alongside his teammate, Sani Emmanuel. The pair trialled in England, Greece and Italy following appearances at the 2009 FIFA U-17 World Cup, in which Nigeria reached the final on home soil, losing to Switzerland.

Onazi was first promoted to the Lazio first team during the 2011–12 season after appearing at youth level. He made his Serie A debut as a substitute in the penultimate match of the season, replacing Senad Lulić in the 90th minute. Lazio recorded a 2–0 victory over Atalanta at the Stadio Atleti Azzurri d'Italia in Bergamo.

In the following 2012–2013 season, Onazi was granted more playing time Under coach Vladimir Petković featuring in a defensive midfielder role alongside Cristian Ledesma. Notably, he started in a UEFA Europa League match against Tottenham Hotspur at White Hart Lane, which ended in a 0–0 draw. On 7 March 2013, he scored his first goal for Lazio against Stuttgart in the last sixteen of the Europa League. He scored his first Serie A goal in a 3–1 win over Inter Milan on 8 May 2013.

On 13 April 2014, he scored his second Serie A goal for Lazio in a 4–2 defeat to Napoli.

On 22 September 2014, Onazi signed a two-year contract extension with Lazio until 2018. Lazio had previously received transfer enquiries in the summer transfer window by three Premier League clubs Everton, Southampton and Sunderland with interest from German, French, Spanish and Russian clubs also being reported. On 31 May 2015, his 88th-minute goal for the final score of 3–2 in Lazio's win over Napoli helped secure the last Champions League place for the club.

Trabzonspor
On 2 August 2016, Onazi moved to Trabzonspor for €3.5 million.

Denizlispor
On 15 January 2020, Denizlispor confirmed the arrival of Onazi from Trabzonspor, another club of Turkey’s top-tier football league, on a free transfer. it was said that Onazi and Denizlispor reached an agreement for a six-month contract with an option for a further one year. He had a contract with Trabzonspor until May 2020.

SønderjyskE
On 4 October 2020, Onazi joined Danish Superliga team SønderjyskE on a deal for the 2020–21 season with an option to extend the deal with two further years. He was released by the club on 5 January 2021, three months after arriving.

Žalgiris
On 18 February 2021, Onazi signed for Lithuanian champions Žalgiris. On 13 July 2021, he scored his first goal for the club against Linfield in the Champions League qualifying stage.

On 18 August 2021, he left FK Žalgiris. In 2021 A Lyga he played 19 matches and scored two goals.

Denizlispor
On 20 August 2021, Onazi joined Turkish side Denizlispor.

Al-Adalah
On 19 January 2022, Onazi joined Saudi side Al-Adalah.

Casertana 
On 29 August 2022, Onazi returned to Italy after six years, as he officially joined Serie D side Casertana.

International career

As a 16-year-old, Onazi represented his country at the 2009 FIFA U-17 World Cup, where Nigeria finished runners-up. However, he was overlooked for selection at the 2011 FIFA U-20 World Cup two years later, despite participating in the training camps in Portugal and Panama.

He made his debut for the senior Nigeria national team in an African Cup of Nations qualification match against Liberia. His first goal came in his second international match, a 3–1 friendly win over Venezuela in Florida.

Onazi was called up to Nigeria's 23-man squad for the 2013 Africa Cup of Nations. He came on as a substitute in Nigeria's first match of the tournament against Burkina Faso, whom they would eventually face again in the final, before going to on to play every minute of all Nigeria's games in the knockout phase, including the final.

He was selected for Nigeria's squad at the 2013 FIFA Confederations Cup. but missed out of the tournament as he suffered a slight knee knock a few weeks before the competition.

Onazi was named in Nigeria's final squad for the 2014 FIFA World Cup in Brazil and started in all four games as Nigeria were eliminated by France in the round of 16. He was also part of the squad for the 2018 FIFA World Cup in Russia., although he did not figure in any of the team's three matches.  Onazi was expectedly left out of the national teams provisional squad to AFCON 2019 after failing to fully recover from an Achilles injury suffered in December 2018 while playing for his club in Turkey.

Personal life
In November 2019 Onazi said he would help pay for Sani Emmanuel's medical expenses.

Career statistics

Club

International

Honours
Lazio
Coppa Italia: 2012–13

Trabzonspor
Turkish Cup: 2019–20

Nigeria
African cup of nations: 2013

References

External links

Living people
1992 births
Sportspeople from Jos
Nigerian footballers
Nigeria international footballers
El-Kanemi Warriors F.C. players
Bodens BK players
My People F.C. players
S.S. Lazio players
Trabzonspor footballers
Denizlispor footballers
SønderjyskE Fodbold players
Al-Adalah FC players
Casertana F.C. players
Serie A players
Süper Lig players
Danish Superliga players
Saudi First Division League players
Association football midfielders
2013 Africa Cup of Nations players
2013 FIFA Confederations Cup players
2014 FIFA World Cup players
Africa Cup of Nations-winning players
2018 FIFA World Cup players
Nigerian expatriate footballers
Nigerian expatriate sportspeople in Sweden
Nigerian expatriate sportspeople in Italy
Nigerian expatriate sportspeople in Turkey
Nigerian expatriate sportspeople in Denmark
Nigerian expatriate sportspeople in Saudi Arabia
Expatriate footballers in Sweden
Expatriate footballers in Italy
Expatriate footballers in Turkey
Expatriate men's footballers in Denmark
Expatriate footballers in Lithuania
Expatriate footballers in Saudi Arabia